Chorley Interchange is a bus station in Chorley, England.

History
Chorley Interchange opened in February 2003 replacing the previous structure. It is owned by Lancashire County Council and operated by Stagecoach Merseyside & South Lancashire. This facility features an enclosed passenger waiting area, travel and tourist information, a coffee shop, and a taxi rank.

Bus services and stops
The majority of services that serve Chorley Interchange are run by Stagecoach Merseyside & South Lancashire. The remainder of the services are operated by Arriva North West, Blackburn Bus Company, and, to a lesser extent Tyrers of Adlington.

Buses go from Chorley to Blackburn, Bolton, Leyland, Manchester, Ormskirk, Preston, and Southport, along with several local services previously branded as Network Chorley.

The bus services are as follows:

 Stand C: 2/2A Blackburn via Brinscall and Wheelton
 Stand D: 
 117 Bolton Street, Redbank and Harrison Road
 118 Lower Burgh Way via Collingwood Road and Eaves Green Road
Stand E: 
 125 Preston bus station & Royal Preston Hospital via Clayton Brook, Walton Summit, Bamber Bridge and Fulwood
 125C Myerscough College via Lower Burgh, Chorley, Clayton Brook, Bamber Bridge, Preston, Fulwood and Broughton College students only and term time only
 Stand G: 109 Preston via Euxton, Buckshaw Village, Leyland, Woodsman and Lostock Hall
 Stand H: 
 119 Tyrers Coaches Preston and 119 Stagecoach Astley Village Monday - Saturday evening and Sunday all day 119 Tyrers Coaches Preston, Astley Village,  Chorley Hospital, Buckshaw Village, Bent Bridge, Towngate, Broadfield, Farington Moss, Whitestake, Penwortham and Broadgate
 114 Towngate Tesco via Whittle-le-Woods, Clayton Brook, Clayton Green, and Clayton-Le-Woods
 Stand K: 362 Wigan, Coppull and Standish
 Stand L: 
 347 Southport via Gillibrands Park, Charnock Richard, Mawdesley, Rufford, Mere Brow, Banks, Crossens & Churchtown
 337 Ormskirk via Gillibrand, Charnock Richard, Eccleston, Croston, Parbold and Burscough
Stand M: 127 Horwich (Asda) via Adlington and Horwich Parkway railway station
Stand N: 125 Bolton via Adlington and Horwich
Stand Q: X8 Keswick via Clayton Brook, Bamber Bridge, Preston, Fulwood, Windermere, Ambleside and Grasmere (Seasonal service)

Train services
Chorley railway station is served by trains operated by Northern Trains to Blackpool North, Preston, Bolton, Manchester <small>(Piccadilly  and Manchester Airport.

References

Buildings and structures in Chorley
Bus stations in Lancashire
Transport infrastructure completed in 2003
2003 establishments in England